The albums discography of American country music artist Lynn Anderson contains 37 studio albums, 21 compilation albums, two live albums, two video albums and three extended plays. She signed her first recording contract in 1966 with Chart Records. The following year, her debut studio album entitled Ride, Ride, Ride was released on the label. It was her first album to debut on the Billboard Top Country Albums chart, peaking at number 25. Her second studio effort, Promises, Promises, was issued in December 1967 and spent 48 weeks on the country albums chart before peaking at number one. The Chart label issued four more studio albums by Anderson until 1970. This included 1969's Songs That Made Country Girls Famous, which was a tribute to female country artists.

Anderson had a major crossover pop hit with "Rose Garden" after signing with Columbia Records in 1970. "Rose Garden"'s major success led to her eleventh studio album of the same name in December 1970. The album spent 77 weeks on the Billboard Top Country Albums chart before peaking at number one. It was her highest-charting album on the Billboard 200 as well, where it reached number 19. Rose Garden became Anderson's highest-charting and biggest-selling album. It later certify platinum in sales from the Recording Industry Association of America and held the record for the longest weeks spent at number one for 24 years. The record was broken in 1995 by Shania Twain with The Woman in Me. Anderson's eleventh studio album, You're Man (1971), was her third to top the Billboard country albums survey. It was followed by a series of studio albums that reached the Billboard country top ten. This included How Can I Unlove You (1971), Cry (1972) and Keep Me in Mind (1973). The Columbia label issued studio albums by Anderson through the rest of the 1970s. As her singles became less successful, her albums did as well. Her final Columbia release was Even Cowgirls Get the Blues (1980), which only reached number 37.

Anderson returned with 1983's Back after a three-year hiatus. The album was her final to reach the Billboard country albums chart, peaking at number 61 in October 1983. She continued to record during the remainder of the decade, releasing 1988's What She Does Best on Mercury Records. She returned in 1992 with the western album, Cowboy's Sweetheart. In 1999, her first live record was issued entitled Live at Billy Bob's Texas. Her 2005 studio release, The Bluegrass Sessions, was nominated for Best Bluegrass Album at the Grammy Awards. Shortly before her death in 2015, Anderson released the gospel project,  Bridges.

Studio albums

Compilation albums

Live albums

Video albums

Extended plays

References

External links
 Lynn Anderson album discography at Discogs

Country music discographies
Discographies of American artists